The 2018 São Paulo gubernatorial election occurred on 7 October 2018 and 28 October 2018. Voters elected a Governor, Vice Governor, 2 Senators, 70 representatives for the Chamber of Deputies, and 94 Legislative Assembly members. The former governor, Márcio França, affiliated to the Brazilian Socialist Party (PSB) took office with the resignation of Geraldo Alckmin in 6 April 2018, and was eligible for a second term and ran for reelection.

The previous gubernatorial election in the state was held in October 2014, in which Geraldo Alckmin of the Brazilian Social Democracy Party was re-elected in the first round with 57.31% of the vote, against 21.53% of Paulo Skaf and 18.22% of Alexandre Padilha.

In the gubernatorial election, the businessman and the former Mayor of São Paulo, João Doria, won the first round at first place with 31.77% of the vote, qualifying for a second round against Márcio França, governor of São Paulo, who got 21.53% of the vote. As the first place did not reach more than 50% of the votes, a second round was held on 28 October 2018.

By a narrow lead of just over 700,000 votes, Doria was elected governor with 51.75% of the vote, and França was defeated with 48.25%.

For the Federal Senate election, federal deputies Major Olímpio (PSL) and Mara Gabrilli (PSDB) were elected to the seats that were once occupied by Aloysio Nunes and Marta Suplicy. They had, respectively, 25.81% and 18.59% of the vote. Eduardo Suplicy (PT), who was councillor of São Paulo at the time, came in third with 13.32% of the vote, and federal deputy Ricardo Tripoli (PSDB) in fourth with 9.00% of the vote.

Gubernatorial candidates

Announced candidacies 

 João Doria (PSDB) - The Brazilian Social Democracy Party decided to announce the candidacy of the former São Paulo's mayor (2017-18), João Doria, who won the party's state primaries, defeating the candidates José Anibal and Floriano Pesaro. His running mate is the federal deputy Rodrigo Garcia, affiliated to the Democrats at the time. Their gubernatorial ticket was supported by five parties: DEM, PSD, PTC, PRB and PP.
 Márcio França (PSB) - The Brazilian Socialist Party announced the candidacy of Márcio França, who ran for re-election. He was the Vice Governor of São Paulo (2015-18) and Governor of São Paulo (2018-19). França was elected as Vice Governor in 2014 São Paulo gubernatorial election and took office as Governor of São Paulo in April 2018, with the resignation of the former governor Geraldo Alckmin, who left the government of São Paulo to run for the Presidency of the Republic in 2018 Brazilian presidential election. His ticket was supported by fifteen parties: PR, PPS, PV, PPL, PHS, PSC, PROS, PMB, Solidariedade, PODE, PRP, PTB and Patriota. His running mate is the Lieutenant colonel Eliane Nikoluk, affiliated to the Party of the Republic (PR).
 Paulo Skaf (MDB) - The Brazilian Democratic Movement confirmed Paulo Skaf as a gubernatorial candidate at a convention held on July 28, 2018. Skaf is a entrepreneur, politician and was the president of the Federation of Industries of the State of São Paulo (FIESP). He already ran for the São Paulo government in 2014, when he received 4,594,708 votes and was defeated in the first round. Running in an independent ticket, his running mate is the Lieutenant colonel Carla Basson, also affiliated to the Brazilian Democratic Movement (MDB).
 Luiz Marinho (PT) - The Workers' Party had primaries on March 2018 to decide who was going to be the gubernatorial candidate. The candidates at the time were the former Mayor of São Bernardo do Campo, Luiz Marinho, and the former mayor of Guarulhos, Elói Pietá. Marinho won the party primaries on March 24, 2018 and was announced as the gubernatorial candidate. He had the support of the Communist Party of Brazil (PCdoB) and his running mate was the teacher Ana Bock, also a member of the Workers' Party.
 Claudio Fernando (PMN) - The Party of National Mobilization decided to announce the state party president and Professor, Claudio Fernando (known as Professor Claudio Fernando), as a gubernatorial candidate. He was also the former Secretary of Ports and Airports of Santos and the Secretary of Economic Development of Guarujá. It was the party's first candidacy for governor in the state of São Paulo. His candidacy had the support of Sustainability Network (REDE), and had Roberto Campos as his running mate.
 Lisete Arelaro (PSOL) - The Socialism and Liberty Party decided to announce the candidacy of the University of São Paulo's teacher, Lisete Arelaro (known as Professora Lisete). Her candidacy was supported by the Brazilian Communist Party (PCB) and her running mate was also the teacher Maurício Costa.
 Toninho Ferreira (PSTU) - The United Socialist Workers' Party announced an independent candidacy and nominated Toninho Ferreira as a gubernatorial candidate on their ticket. Toninho is a lawyer, a former metallurgist and leader of the Metalworkers Union of São José dos Campos and region. His running mate was Ariana Gonçalves, a teacher at the  Municipal Education Network of São Paulo.
 Rodrigo Tavares (PRTB) - The Brazilian Labour Renewal Party announced the lawyer Rodrigo Tavares as a gubernatorial candidate on their ticket. His candidacy was supported by the Social Liberal Party. He has worked in several municipal secretariats in Guarulhos, such as Health, Government, Culture, Social Assistance and Legal Affairs. His last position was Director of the Municipal Secretary of Labor in Guarulhos. His running mate is Jairo Glikson, a lawyer affiliated to the Social Liberal Party.
 Major Costa e Silva (DC) - The Christian Democracy party announced the Major Adriano Costa e Silva as a gubernatorial candidate at a party convention on 28 July, 2018. His running mate is Fátima, a Corporal of the Military Police (known as Cabo Fátima). 
 Marcelo Cândido (PDT) - The party firstly announced its support for the candidacy of Márcio França, however, on 5 August 2018 the party decided to announce the former mayor of Suzano, Marcelo Cândido, as a gubernatorial candidate. His running mate is Gleides Sodré.
 Rogério Chequer (NOVO) - The New Party announced the gubernatorial candidacy of Rogério Chequer, a production engineer, businessman, political activist and one of the founders of the Movement Come To The Streets (Movimento Vem Pra Rua). His running mate is Andrea Menezes.
 Edson Dorta/Lilian Miranda (PCO) - Dorta ran in the 2016 elections as a candidate for mayor of Campinas and was chosen as the party's gubernatorial candidate in 2018 São Paulo gubernatorial election. His running mate was Lilian Miranda. However, on 11 September 2018, his candidacy was denied by the Regional Electoral Court of São Paulo (TRE/SP). Days later, on 17 September, the party registered his former running mate, Lilian Miranda, as a gubernatorial candidate.

Candidates in runoff

Candidates failing to make runoff

Candidacy denied

Declined candidates
 José Serra (PSDB) - Senator from São Paulo 1996–1998, 2002–2003, 2015–2016 and since 2017; Minister of Foreign Affairs 2016–2017; Governor of São Paulo 2007–2010; Mayor of São Paulo 2005–2006; president of the PSDB 2003–2005; Minister of Health 1998–2002; Minister of Planning and Budget 1995–1996; Federal Deputy from São Paulo 1987–1995; State Secretary for Economics and Planning of São Paulo 1983–1986. Candidate for Mayor of São Paulo in 1988, 1996 and 2012 and for President of Brazil in 2002 and 2010.
 Gilberto Kassab (PSD) - Minister of Science, Technology, Innovation and Communication since 2016; Minister of Cities 2015–2016; president of the PSD 2011–2015; Mayor of São Paulo 2006–2013; Vice Mayor of São Paulo 2005–2006; Federal Deputy from São Paulo 1999–2005; Municipal Secretary of Planning of São Paulo 1997–1998. Candidate for Senator from São Paulo in 2014.
 Celso Russomanno (PRB) - Federal Deputy from São Paulo 1995–2011 and since 2015. Candidate for governor in 2010 and for Mayor of São Paulo in 2012 and 2016.
Rodrigo Garcia - State Secretary of Housing of São Paulo since 2015; Federal Deputy from São Paulo 2011 and 2014–2015; State Secretary of Social Development of São Paulo 2011–2013; Special Municipal Secretary of De-bureaucracy of São Paulo 2008–2010; State Deputy of São Paulo 1999–2008.
 Alexandre Zeitune (REDE) - Vice Mayor of Guarulhos since 2017; Municipal Secretary of Education, Culture, Sports and Leisure of Guarulhos 2017. 
 Gabriel Chalita (PDT) - Municipal Secretary of Education of São Paulo 2015–2016; Federal Deputy from São Paulo 2011–2015; Alderman of São Paulo 2009–2011; State Secretary of Education of São Paulo 2003–2007. Candidate for Vice Mayor of São Paulo in 2016.

Lost in convention
 José Aníbal (PSDB) - President of the Institute Teotônio Vilela since 2015; Senator from São Paulo 2016–2017; State Secretary of Energy of São Paulo 2011–2015; Alderman of São Paulo 2005–2006; State Secretary of Economic Development, Science, Technology and Innovation of São Paulo 1999–2001; Federal Deputy from São Paulo 1990–1999 and 2007–2011. Candidate for Senator from São Paulo in 2002.
 Luiz Felipe d'Ávila (PSDB) - political scientist, professor, speaker and coach in Public Leadership.
 Floriano Pesaro (PSDB) - State Secretary of Social Development of São Paulo since 2015; Federal Deputy from São Paulo since 2015; Alderman of São Paulo 2009–2014; Municipal Secretary of Social Assistance and Development of São Paulo 2005–2006.
 Sâmia Bomfim (PSOL) - Alderwoman of São Paulo since 2017.
 Carlos Giannazi (PSOL) - State Deputy of São Paulo since 2007; Alderman of São Paulo 2001–2007. Candidate for Mayor of São Paulo in 2012 and for Vice Mayor of São Paulo in 2008.
 Fernando Haddad (PT) - Mayor of São Paulo 2013–2017; Minister of Education 2005–2012. Candidate for Mayor of São Paulo in 2016.

Opinion polls

First round

Second round

Debates

Governor

First round

Second round

Senator

Senate candidates

Confirmed candidates

Declined candidates

Results

Governor

Senator

Chamber of Deputies

Legislative Assembly

References

2018 Brazilian gubernatorial elections
October 2018 events in South America
2018